Cassis is the 20th solo studio album by Japanese singer-songwriter Yōsui Inoue, released in July 2002.

The album includes "Kimerareta Rhythm", which was featured on the Academy Award-nominated motion picture The Twilight Samurai, directed by Yoji Yamada. The song "You are the Top" was originally contributed to the same-titled musical by Kōki Mitani. Two singles were cut from the album: "Kono Yo no Sadame" and "Final Love Song"; both songs were featured on the TV advertisings of Kirin Beverage starring Inoue himself.

Track listing
All songs written and composed by Yōsui Inoue, unless otherwise indicated
"" - 4:23
"" - 5:00
"Final Love Song" - 4:25
"" - 4:28
"" - 6:18
"" - 3:19
"" (Inoue/Natsumi Hirai) - 3:10
"" (Inoue/Hirai) - 2:28
"You are the Top" (Inoue/Hirai/Kōki Mitani) - 4:28
"" - 4:47
"" - 4:13

Personnel
Yōsui Inoue - vocals, acoustic guitar, electric guitar, hand-claps
Tsuyoshi Kon - electric guitar, acoustic guitar
Haruo Kubota - electric guitar
Takayuki Hijikata - electric guitar
Tsuneo Imabori - electric guitar, acoustic guitar, computer programming
Chiharu Mikuzuki - electric bass, uplight bass, 12-string guitar
Masafumi Minato - drums
Hideo Yamaki - drums
Matarou Misawa - percussion
Yahiro Tomohiro - percussion
Nobuo Kurata - acoustic piano
Natsumi Hirai - acoustic piano
Yasuharu Nakanishi - acoustic piano, electric piano
Yoshiki Kojima - acoustic piano, keyboards, organ
Yūta Saitō - acoustic piano, keyboards
Masao Ōmura - keyboards
Banana U-G - keyboards, computer programming
Kazuya Miyazaki - computer programming
Tetsuo Ishikawa - computer programming
Yōichi Murata - trombone, bass trombone
Kōji Nishimura - trumpet
Shirou Sasaki - trumpet
Masahiko Sugasaka - trumpet
Takuo Yamamoto - saxophone
Bob Zang - saxophone
Masakuni Takeno - saxophone
Udai Shike - cello
Jun - background vocals
Chie Nagai - background vocals

Chart positions

Album

Singles

2002 albums
Yōsui Inoue albums